Wythall is a village and civil parish in the Bromsgrove District, in the north-east corner of the county of Worcestershire, England. Wythall parish borders Solihull and Birmingham, and had a population of 12,269 in the UK census of 2021.

The civil parish was created in 1911 when the remainder of the previous King's Norton civil parish was absorbed into the then County Borough of Birmingham. 

Wythall village is around 7 miles south of Birmingham City Centre (a 20-minute train journey from Wythall railway station) along Alcester Road. There are a number of 19th century buildings on this road including the Wythall Institute (erected 1888/89). The civil parish of Wythall has always included Drake's Cross, Hollywood and Headley Heath and today also includes Major's Green and the formerly undeveloped Worcestershire part of Walker's Heath. Wythall village itself is generally the area covered by the parish ward of Grimes Hill and the northeastern portion of the Wythall Heath parish ward, combined population 2,080, although the Silver Street and Chapel Lane areas are also usually included (the remainder of the Wythall Heath parish ward additionally includes the subsidiary settlements of Inkford and Tanner's Green along with the Kings Norton Golf Course). The easternmost section of Wythall village, around the railway station, was traditionally referred to as Grimes Hill.

The former St Mary's Anglican church has a roof and stair turret added by W.H. Bidlake.

There are two primary schools within Wythall parish, the Coppice Primary School in Hollywood and Meadow Green Primary School in Wythall village. There was previously a school in Silver Street from circa 1875 to 1992 which for many years catered for all primary aged school children in Wythall and the surrounding area, until a growing population required more school development. Woodrush High School in Hollywood opened in 1958 for children aged 11 and over, and Shawhurst Infants School (next door to Woodrush) opened around 1967, leaving what was by now called Silvermead School as a junior school. Meadow Green School opened in the early 1960s to give additional junior and infant provision. During 1991-92 an extension was built on Shawhurst Infants School, and its development became the Coppice Primary School. The Silvermead site was then closed, although many of its buildings have been converted into homes as Silvermead Court. The Coppice Primary School became an Academy in December 2011 and since 2012 is the largest primary school in the area with a three form entry.

The local secondary school, Woodrush High School, has an Astroturf and playing fields backing on to the Coppice Primary School.

Until 2002 a private school, Innisfree House, existed in Station Road. Its original purpose was the education of the children of officers of the RAF station (see below), and in the years post-World War II was attended by the young Bruce Chatwin whose parents were living on a smallholding at Umberslade some 3 miles away.

From 1939 to 1959 Wythall was home to a Royal Air Force station, initially housing a barrage balloon facility, and latterly, 1952–57, a Joint Services School of Applied Linguistics, training men from the RN and RAF in Russian military terminology and the use of radios for Signals Intelligence purposes; additionally, Chinese, Czech, German and Polish were taught to small numbers of RAF men. Part of the site is now occupied by the Transport Museum, Chapel Lane, which has a collection of historic buses and battery electric vehicles.

A sawmill, currently named Davies Timber Ltd., has been in operation for over 100 years and was steam powered at some point in its history,  with maps from 1838 also showing a brickyard opposite the site.

In addition to the regular train service, the village is linked to Redditch and Kings Heath by Diamond Bus service 150 and hourly Landflight service A4 to Solihull, both operating Mon-Sat.

References

External links 

 Wythall Parish Council
 Wythall History Society
 Photographs of Wythall
 Transport Museum, Wythall
 http://www.wythall-hollywood-funrun.org.uk/
 http://www.daviestimber.co.uk
Wythall Express News
 https://www.wythallnews.co.uk/
 

Villages in Worcestershire